The "Pretty Little Lightning Paw" E.P. is an EP by Thee Silver Mt. Zion Memorial Orchestra & Tra-La-La Band under the name Thee Silver Mountain Reveries. It was released May 2004 on Constellation Records. The name the band assumed for this EP was temporary; they have since reverted to using Thee Silver Mt. Zion Memorial Orchestra.

Many of the band members switched instruments for this recording. For example, Sophie Trudeau, who usually plays violin, plays bass guitar. Ian Ilavsky, usually one of the band's guitarists, plays drums. When recording was complete, the EP was played on a boombox and rerecorded from that, giving it a rough sound.

On the track, "There's a River in the Valley Made of Melting Snow", the Hebrew lyric, "baruch atta adonai", means "bless the Lord".

Track listing
 "More Action! Less Tears!" – 5:20
 "Microphones in the Trees" – 9:47
 "Pretty Little Lightning Paw" – 10:01
 "There's a River in the Valley Made of Melting Snow" – 5:08

Personnel
Thee Silver Mountain Reveries
Thierry Amar – violin, bass guitar, vocals, pianohandle
Ian Ilavsky – drums
Efrim Menuck – guitar, piano, organ, vocals, feedback, toybox
Jessica Moss – violin, vocals
Sophie Trudeau – bass guitar

Other musicians
Aimee – yells on "More Action! Less Tears!"
Chad – vocals on "Microphones in the Trees" and "Pretty Little Lightning Paw"
Nadia – vocals on "Microphones in the Trees" and "Pretty Little Lightning Paw"

Technical
Harris Newman – mastering

Notes

External links
The "Pretty Little Lightning Paw" E.P. at Constellation Records

Thee Silver Mt. Zion albums
2004 EPs
Constellation Records (Canada) EPs